The 1901 Dickinson football team was an American football team that represented Dickinson College as an independent during the 1901 college football season. The team compiled a 4–6 record and was outscored by a total of 109 to 79. Ralph Hutchinson was the head coach.

Schedule

References

Dickinson
Dickinson Red Devils football seasons
Dickinson football